Ben Winchell (born July 3, 1994) is an American film and television actor, known for playing Aiden in the film Teen Spirit and Dixon Ticonderoga in the series A.N.T. Farm. He has played the titular role of Max Steel in the live-action film Max Steel.

Early life 
Winchell was born in Lawrenceville, Georgia, and grew up in Duluth.

Career 
In 2011, Winchell played the role of Aiden in the television film Teen Spirit, which premiered on ABC Family on August 7, 2011. He appeared as Eric in the USA Network's drama series Necessary Roughness.

In 2013, Winchell played Dixon Ticonderoga in the Disney Channel's sitcom A.N.T. Farm.

In 2015, Winchell played Benjamin in the MTV's teen drama series Finding Carter.

Winchell has played the role of Max Steel in the critically panned eponymous live-action film opposite Ana Villafañe. Stewart Hendler directed the film and was released in 2016 by Open Road Films.

Filmography

References

External links 
 

Living people
1994 births
People from Atlanta
Male actors from Atlanta
American male film actors
American male television actors
21st-century American male actors